Cryptolepis sinensis is a plant species in the genus Cryptolepis, native to Taiwan, China (Guangdong, Guangxi, Guizhou, Hainan, Yunnan) and southeast Asia (Cambodia, India, Indonesia, Malaysia, Vietnam).

Cryptolepis  sinensis is one of the food sources for the common crow (Euploea core), a common butterfly found in South Asia. USDA, ARS, National Genetic Resources Program. Germplasm Resources Information Network - (GRIN) [Data from 07-Oct-06].

References

External links

Periplocoideae
Indomalayan realm flora
Flora of China
Flora of Taiwan
Flora of tropical Asia
Plants described in 1920